Professor Henri-François-Émile Termier (13 December 1897 – 12 August 1989) was a French geologist.

Born at Lyon into a scholarly family, he served in the First World War as an artillery officer during which he earned a Croix de Guerre. After working as an assistant at the university in Montpellier (1923 - 1925), he became a geologist working for the Service géologique du Maroc (Morocco Mine Service), where he worked until 1940, becoming very famous for his studies of stratigraphy and fossil fauna (he found the first specimens of Titanichthys agassizi). Later he taught at the university of Algeria (1945) and ten years later he became a chairman at the Sorbonne. He was married to professor Geneviève Termier, another famous French paleontologist.

Selected bibliography 

 Paleontologie marocaine, 5 volumes, with Geneviève Termier
 Etudes geologiques sur le Maroc central et le Moyen Atlas septentrional
 Traite de geologie
 Traite de stratigraphie
 Biologie des premiers fossiles
 Les Animaux prehistoriques
 Histoire de la Terre

External links 
 Henri Termier wife's obituary with info and photo of them both
 Who's Who in France

1897 births
1989 deaths
Scientists from Lyon
Academic staff of the University of Montpellier
Academic staff of the University of Paris
20th-century French geologists